ABC is the second studio album by the Jackson 5, released on May 8, 1970 by Motown Records. It featured the No. 1 singles "ABC" and "The Love You Save". Also present on the LP are several notable album tracks, including a cover of Funkadelic's "I'll Bet You", "I Found That Girl" (the only lead song by brother Jermaine), and "The Young Folks", originally recorded by Diana Ross and the Supremes.

The album peaked at No. 4 on the Billboard Pop Albums Chart and at No. 1 on the Billboard Black Albums chart in the United States. It was ranked No. 98 on VH1's All-Time Albums Top 100 list. It remains one of the Jackson 5's most popular efforts. The title track was nominated for the Grammy Award for Best Pop Performance by a Duo or Group with Vocals in 1971.

Re-release
In 2001, Motown Records remastered all J5 albums in a "Two Classic Albums/One CD" series (much like they did in the late 1980s). This album was paired up with Diana Ross Presents The Jackson 5. The bonus track was an outtake, "Oh, I've Been Blessed", a song also released on the rare 1979 outtakes album Boogie.

An alternate version of the title track appears on the CD Jackson 5 – I Want You Back! Unreleased Masters released in 2009.

Track listing

Charts

Album

Weekly charts

Year-end charts

Singles

See also
List of number-one R&B albums of 1970 (U.S.)

References

The Jackson 5 albums
1970 albums
Motown albums
Albums produced by the Corporation (record production team)
Albums produced by Hal Davis